The Thing Which Solomon Overlooked is the seventh album by Japanese experimental band, Boris. It is one of the first Boris releases completely devoid of any vocals, and the first that does not feature drumming. The album was released in a one-time pressing of 550 copies on vinyl by the Finnish label Kult of Nihilow.

In 2006, the band released both The Thing Which Solomon Overlooked 2 and The Thing Which Solomon Overlooked 3, the second and third parts, respectively, of a series of albums. In 2013, the trilogy was remastered for the boxset The Thing Which Solomon Overlooked - Chronicle.

Compared to most of the band's discography, these albums contain primarily improvised music.

The song "A Bao A Qu" featured in this album shares the same title as one featured on the album Soundtrack from the Film Mabuta no Ura; however, the two are completely different songs.

Track listing

Personnel

Line-up
 Takeshi – bass
 Atsuo – effects
 Wata – guitar, effects

Additional credits
 Souichirou Nakamura – mixing, mastering
 Boris – production
 Fangs Anal Satan – artwork

Pressing History

References

External links
 

2004 albums
Boris (band) albums